Arkansas Highway 371 may refer to:

Arkansas Highway 371 (1970-1994), now numbered 13
U.S. Route 371 in Arkansas, formed in 1994